Biota is an American experimental electronic music ensemble.

Musical career
Amid a fertile creative environment in Fort Collins, Colorado, in the late 1970s, Biota's first recording projects were produced under the name Mnemonist Orchestra (shortened soon after to Mnemonists). Founded by fellow scientists and community radio engineers Mark Derbyshire and William Sharp, the Mnemonists ensemble of artists, musicians, and college-town bohemians released five self-styled albums between 1980 and 1984 on the group's Dys label. Horde (1981, Dys), a seminal album of electronically processed music, garnered critical attention — including from the Recommended Records/RēR label, who rereleased the LP in 1984 — for its groundbreaking use of unconventional sound manipulation and musique concrète techniques. After the release of Gyromancy in 1984, the group split into two collaborative factions: a visual-arts collective, which retained the name Mnemonists, and the musical group, Biota.

Since the mid-1980s, Biota has released numerous idiosyncratic titles, mostly on RēR. These include Rackabones (1985, Dys) and Bellowing Room (1987) (separate albums focusing on themes of displacement, solitude, and the consequences of long-term institutionalization), Tinct (1988), the Awry 10" (1988, Bad Alchemy), and Tumble (1989), a commissioned work for RēR. Almost Never (1992, RēR) features three voluminous suites for winds, strings, and processed acoustic/ethnic/antique instrumentation. Recordings and production for these and other Biota albums primarily took place at Bughouse Studio in Loveland, Colorado, and Dys studios in Fort Collins and Bellvue, Colorado. 

By the time of the release of Object Holder (1995, RēR), the group had expanded beyond its immediate geographic boundaries to include U.K. drummer Chris Cutler (Henry Cow, News From Babel), New York-based vocalist Susanne Lewis (Hail), Denver prog guitar virtuoso Andy Kredt (d. 2006), and East Coast multi-instrumentalist/composer Charles O'Meara (a.k.a. C.W. Vrtacek of Forever Einstein, d. 2018), who subsequently joined the group as an essential member, contributing numerous classically-based piano compositions over the course of several albums. Object Holder was the first Biota album to feature "songs", with lyrics written by Biota's Tom Katsimpalis as well as by guest artist Cutler, and performed by Lewis.

For Invisible Map (2001, RēR), the group welcomed Gen Heistek (Set Fire to Flames, HṚṢṬA) on vocals and violin. AllMusic.com states, "With its wide range covering delicate post-folkish pop songs to ambient soundscapes, Invisible Map may be the collective's most accomplished and accessible release to date. All music styles (folk, jazz, blues, rock, musique concrète, free improv, etc.) coalesce to be filtered through the dreamer's ears — background vocals are slightly treated, soloing instruments are heard from a distance, rhythm tracks are deliberately just a bit out of sync. This way, the simple tunes never really come into focus, giving the whole album an aura of mystery."

The group reemerged in 2007 with its next release, Half a True Day (RēR), an album of increased nuance and subtlety (lost on the previous AllMusic reviewer), introducing folk guitarist and vocalist Kristianne Gale. On Cape Flyaway (2012, RēR), traditional folk ballads, sung by Gale, are interspersed amid original Biota compositions. 2014's Funnel to a Thread (RēR) yields at times a more understated take on some of the same instrumental/vocal elements and themes contained within the previous two CDs, only now influenced perhaps more deeply by the aesthetics of Morton Feldman, Hector Zazou, Mark Hollis, and other masters of electroacoustic sound exploration, minimalism, and Americana. 

Biota celebrated its 40th year of existence in 2019 with the release of its latest full-length album on RēR, Fragment for Balance:

2019 also saw the release of The Biota Box, a 6-CD set that highlights music from four decades of the group's recorded output (including music released as Mnemonists) and includes Counterbalance, a companion CD to Fragment for Balance of previously unreleased Biota recordings/compositions. The inner booklet contained in Counterbalance features a detailed history of the group, with commentary by co-founders Sharp and Derbyshire.

Biota's current lineup, as featured on Fragment for Balance and Counterbalance, consists of Kristianne Gale (vocals, guitar), James Gardner (winds, arrangement), Tom Katsimpalis (guitars, bass), Randy Miotke (trumpet, engineering), Mark Piersel (guitars), Bill Sharp (production, arrangement), Gordon H. Whitlow (organs, accordion), Larry Wilson (drums, percussion), Randy Yeates (keyboards), and David Zekman (violin, banjolin). As with all Biota releases, extensive visual works are provided by the Mnemonists visual-arts contingent (featuring through the years Larry Wilson, Randy Yeates, Ken DeVries, Tom Katsimpalis, James Dixon, Bill Ellsworth, Dana Sharp, Heidi Eversley, Joy Froding (d. 2015), Dirk Vallons, Ann Stretton, E.M. Thomas, Stan Starbuck, Simon Abbate, et al).

Working methods
Biota adheres to an unpredictable method of organizing sounds that ideally invites listeners to imbue proceedings with their own individualized interpretations and experiences (much like interpreting a work of abstract visual art), thereby allowing for an element of "listener composition". Such a concept is in keeping with notions of community collaboration and song evolution inherent in many forms of traditional folk music.

Performance
Biota-Mnemonists has taken to the stage for live performance only twice — in 1981, at the Colorado State University art school in Fort Collins, Colorado, and in November 1990 at the then-annual New Music America festival, held that year in Montreal, Quebec. Under the festival banner "Musiques Actuelles", the group premiered a suite of original works composed specifically for the occasion, featuring live (real-time) production and projected animation created by Mnemonists artist Heidi Eversley. The entire musical program of the New Music America performance was eventually released on CD as Musique Actuelle 1990 (2004), on Anomalous.

Discography

As Mnemonist Orchestra
 Mnemonist Orchestra (LP, 1979, DYS 01, Dys Records)

As Mnemonists
 Some Attributes of a Living System (LP, 1980, DYS 02, Dys Records)
 Horde (LP, 1981, DYS 03, Dys Records; LP rerelease, 1984, Recommended Records))
 Roto-Limbs (cassette, 1981, DYS 06, Dys Records)
 Biota (LP, 1982, DYS 07, Dys Records)
 Gyromancy (LP, 1984, DYS 10, Dys Records; CD rerelease, 2004, RēR)
 "Nailed/Tic" (7", 1984, Recommended Records)

As Biota
 Rackabones (2xLP, 1985, DYS 12, Dys Records)
 Bellowing Room (LP, 1987, Recommended Records)
 Tinct (LP, 1988, Recommended Records)
 Bellowing Room/Tinct (CD rerelease, 1990, RēR)
 Awry (10", 1988, Bad Alchemy)
 Tumble (CD, 1989, RēR)
 Almost Never (CD, 1992, RēR)
 Object Holder (CD, 1995, RēR)
 Invisible Map (CD, 2001, RēR)
 Half a True Day (CD, 2007, RēR)
 Cape Flyaway (CD, 2012, RēR)
 Funnel to a Thread (CD, 2014, RēR)
 Fragment for Balance (CD, 2019, RēR)
 The Biota Box (6-CD anthology; includes Counterbalance, a CD of previously unreleased material, 2019, RēR)

As Biota-Mnemonists
 Musique Actuelle 1990 (live) (CD, 2004, Anomalous Records)

Guest appearances
 "Fakeloo" on Bad Alchemy, Nr. 5 (cassette, Bad Alchemy, 1986)
 "Early Rest Home" on Rē Records Quarterly Vol.1 No.3 (LP, RēR 0103, 1986)
 also released on Rē Records Quarterly Selections from Vol. 1 (CD, RēR, 1991)
 "Hidden Aboard" on A Classic Guide to No Man's Land (CD, No Man's Land, 1988)
 "Walk Aside" on Rē Records Quarterly Vol.4 No.1 (CD, RēR 0401, 1994)
 Art Bears, The Art Box (2004, remixes, RēR)
 "Watch and Watch" on $100 Guitar Project (CD, Bridge Records, 2013)

Related projects
 Mark Piersel, Distant Lives (cassette, Dys, 1983)

References

External links
Biota homepage

Electronic music groups from Colorado
Musical groups established in 1979
American experimental musical groups
American artist groups and collectives